Blaine Taylor (born January 14, 1958) is a former American college basketball coach most well known for being the head coach of the Old Dominion Monarchs men's basketball team from 2001 until 2013.  

Taylor played as a point guard for the University of Montana from 1979 to 1981. In 1981, he was recognized as the school's most outstanding male athlete and earned the Naseby Rhinehart Award as the Most Inspirational Player. Taylor later became an assistant coach at Montana while a graduate student from 1981 to 1984 and again became an assistant to Stew Morrill from 1986 to 1991. He was promoted to head coach of the Grizzlies in 1991 and led the team to two NCAA tournament appearances through 1998. Taylor became an assistant coach under former Grizzly coach Mike Montgomery at Stanford University from 1998 to 2001. The Cardinal were invited to the NCAA tournament during every year of Taylor's tenure, reaching the Elite Eight in the 2001 NCAA Division I men's basketball tournament.

During his tenure at Old Dominion, Taylor has led the Monarchs to CAA Tournament championships in 2005, 2010, and 2011 and appearances in the NCAA tournament in 2005, 2007, 2010, and 2011. The Monarchs lost in their first NCAA tournament game on three of Taylor's trips, but broke through with a first round victory over Notre Dame in 2010 before losing to Baylor in the second round. Taylor also led the Monarchs to the 2006 NIT semifinals, where the team lost to the Michigan Wolverines. The Monarchs also won the inaugural CollegeInsider.com Postseason Tournament in 2009. On February 5, 2013, Taylor was fired by Old Dominion in the middle of a 2-20 season. In the summer of 2016, it was announced that Taylor was hired by Russell Turner, head coach of UC Irvine as an assistant. The two had both worked as assistants at Stanford. After stepping down from UC Irvine to have ankle and knee replacement surgery, Taylor returned to Old Dominion to work as fundraiser for the university's athletic foundation.

Head coaching record

References

External links
 Old Dominion profile

1958 births
Living people
American men's basketball coaches
American men's basketball players
College basketball announcers in the United States
College men's basketball head coaches in the United States
High school basketball coaches in the United States
Montana Grizzlies basketball coaches
Montana Grizzlies basketball players
Old Dominion Monarchs men's basketball coaches
Place of birth missing (living people)
Point guards
Stanford Cardinal men's basketball coaches
UC Irvine Anteaters men's basketball coaches